Humphrey Cavell (by 1525 ~ 17 November 1558) was an English politician.

He was a Member (MP) of the Parliament of England for Ludgershall in March 1553, Saltash in April and November 1554, and for Bodmin in 1555.

References

1558 deaths
Members of the pre-1707 English Parliament for constituencies in Cornwall
Year of birth uncertain
English MPs 1553 (Edward VI)